"" ("Thou fairest land of mine"), officially "" ("My fairest land"), is the national anthem of the Faroe Islands. It was written in 1906 by headteacher Símun av Skarði, and the melody was composed in 1907 by violinist Petur Alberg.

History

Composition 
The song was written in a work dated 1 February 1906 by Símun av Skarði, the headmaster of a high school in Føgrulið, southwest of Klaksvík. It was written during a time of strong division in the Faroe Islands between conservatives who wanted to preserve Danish rule and autonomists who wanted more self-government, of which Símun was the latter.

Violinist Petur Alberg wrote the first notes of the music of the anthem on 4 September 1907, after the melody came to him that evening. He later sang the melody down the phone in the Løgting to Símun av Skarði, who liked it. Petur then sent it to a music teacher he knew in Akureyri, Iceland, and to asked him to harmonise it for a male quartet. In October 1907, the male quartet arrangement arrived, and singers began to practice it for a Boxing Day concert in Sloan's Hall in Tórshavn. Petur, not daring to reveal the song's author, told the singers the song was Icelandic, by a certain Jón Sveinsson. However, the singers liked the song. The song was performed at the concert on 26 December 1907, which was the first time any song by Petur had been performed publicly and the first time "Tú alfagra land mítt" was performed publicly.

Distribution 
On 8 January 1908, "Tú alfagra land mítt" was published in the Faroese newspaper Tingakrossur. It was then published in the Lesibók, a literary history in chronological order, in 1911.

In 1925, a Nynorsk translation of the song by Rolf Hjort Schøgen was published in the Tingakrossur. In 1928, a Danish translation by university student Tormod Jørgensen was published in Højskolebladet No. 7928. An Icelandic translation by Jochum M. Eggertsson appeared in the magazine Dvöl in 1935. In 1943, an English translation by Padre G. C. C. Knowleson was featured in the notes of the magazine The Pioneer by some British soldiers in the Faroe Islands during World War II.

As the national anthem 
"Tú alfagra land mítt" won out in a rivalry with "Eg oyggjar veit" ("I know some islands"), from 1877, on which song should become the national anthem of the Faroe Islands. "Tú alfagra land mítt" has been sung at all festivals in the Faroe Islands, and it has been in the psalm book of the Faroese Church since 1990. The national radio station Útvarp Føroya, established in 1957, played it every night before ending its broadcast for the evening.

Lyrics

Literature
W.B. Lockwood: An Introduction to Modern Faroese, Tórshavn 1977

Notes

References

External links
Faroese national anthem (with lyrics)
Faroese national anthem (instrumental only)

National anthems
National symbols of the Faroe Islands
Danish anthems
European anthems
1906 songs
National anthem compositions in E-flat major